Userkhaure-setepenre Setnakhte (also called Setnakht or Sethnakht) was the first pharaoh (1189 BC–1186 BC) of the Twentieth Dynasty of the New Kingdom of Egypt and the father of Ramesses III.

Accession
Setnakhte was not the son, brother or a direct descendant of either Twosret or Merneptah Siptah—the immediately preceding two pharaohs—nor that of Siptah's predecessor Seti II, whom Setnakht formally considered the last legitimate ruler. It is possible that he was a usurper who seized the throne during a time of crisis and political unrest, or he could have been a member of a minor line of the Ramesside royal family who emerged as pharaoh. Senakhte married Tiy-Merenese, perhaps a daughter of Merneptah.

A connection between Setnakhte's successors and the preceding Nineteenth Dynasty is suggested by the fact that one of Ramesses II's children also bore this name and that similar names are shared by Setnakhte's descendants such as Ramesses, Amun-her-khepshef, Seth-her-khepshef and Monthu-her-khepshef.<ref>Nos ancêtres de l'Antiquité 1991. Christian Settipani, p.153, 173 & 175</ref>

Reign length
Setnakhte was originally believed to have enjoyed a reign of only two years based upon his Year 2 Elephantine stela but his third regnal year is now attested in Inscription No. 271 on Mount Sinai.  If his theoretical accession date is assumed to be II Shemu 10, based on the date of his Elephantine stela, Setnakhte would have ruled Egypt for at least two years and 11 months before he died, or nearly three full years. This date is only three months removed from Twosret's highest known date of Year 8, III Peret 5, and is based upon a calculation of Ramesses III's known accession date of I Shemu 26. Peter Clayton also assigned Setnakhte a reign of three years in his 1994 book on the Egyptian pharaohs.

In a mid-January 2007 issue of the Egyptian weekly Al-Ahram, however, Egyptian antiquity officials announced that a recently discovered and well-preserved quartzite stela belonging to the High Priest of Amun Bakenkhunsu was explicitly dated to Year 4 of Setnakhte's reign. The Al-Ahram article notes that this data:  
 contradicts...the official record, which says Setnakhte ruled Egypt for only three years. According to the new information provided by the stela, Setnakhte's reign certainly lasted for four years, and may have continued for [a little] longer.

Zahi Hawass, the former Secretary General of Egypt's Supreme Council of Antiquities, declared the discovery to be one of the most important finds of 2006 because "it adjusts the history of the 20th Dynasty and reveals more about the life of Bakenkhunsu."  As Setnakhte's reign was short, he may have come to the throne fairly late in life.

However, the Al-Ahram figure does not change the fact that Setnakhte likely truly ruled Egypt for only three, rather than four, full years since there are no Year 1 dates attested for him, and his famous Year 2 Elephantine stela states that Setnakhte finally secured his kingship after defeating all his opponents and challengers to the throne in his second year. The date of the Elephantine stela in Year 2 II Shemu day 10 of Setnakhte's reign—the date of which is mentioned only halfway in the stela rather than at its start—is immediately followed by this proclamation: "There were no opponents against His Majesty, l.p.h., in all the lands."

This reference to the defeat of Setnakhte's enemies implies that this specific date marked the termination of a conflict—presumably Setnakhte's struggle for the throne—which extended partly into his second year and means that Setnakhte's first year would have overlapped with Twosret's final year, if Twosret was his opponent. Therefore, he likely did not even rule Egypt in his theoretical first year and could only properly administer the country from sometime during his second year. In any event, there was an interregnum lasting at least a year in which no ruler controlled all of Egypt and Setnakhte's effective reign length should be reduced by a year from 4 to 3 years.

Setnakhte's Elephantine stela touches on this chaotic period and refers explicitly to the expulsion of certain Asiatics, who fled Egypt, abandoning the gold which they had looted from Egyptian temples. It is uncertain the degree to which this inscription referred to contemporary events or rather repeated anti-Asiatic sentiment from the reign of Pharaoh Ahmose I. Setnakhte identified with the God Atum or Temu, and built a temple to this God at Per-Atum (Biblical Pithom).

After his death, Setnakhte was buried in KV14 which was originally designed to be Twosret's royal tomb. His mummy has never been identified with certainty, although the so–called "mummy in the boat" found in KV35 was sometimes identified with him, an attribution rejected by Aidan Dodson who rather believes the body belonged to a royal family member of Amenhotep II of the 18th Dynasty. In any case the mummy was destroyed in a looting in 1901, thus preventing any analysis on it.

Monuments

While Setnakhte's reign was still comparatively brief, it was just long enough for him to stabilize the political situation in Egypt and establish his son, Rameses III, as his successor to the throne of Egypt. The Bakenkhunsu stela reveals that it was Setnakhte who began the construction of a Temple of Amun-Re in Karnak which was eventually completed by his son, Ramesses III. Setnakhte also started work on a tomb, KV11, in the Valley of the Kings, but stopped it when the tombcarvers accidentally broke into the tomb of the Nineteenth Dynasty Pharaoh Amenmesse. Setnakhte then appropriated the tomb of Queen Twosret (KV14), his predecessor, for his own use.

Papyrus Harris
The beginning of the Great Harris Papyrus or Papyrus Harris I, which documents the reign of Ramesses III, provides some details about Setnakhte's rise to power. An excerpt of James Henry Breasted's 1906 translation of this document is provided below:

The land of Egypt was overthrown from without, and every man was thrown out of his right; they had no "chief mouth" for many years formerly until other times. The land of Egypt was in the hands of chiefs and of rulers of towns; one slew his neighbour, great and small. Other times having come after it, with empty years, Irsu ('a self-made man'), a certain Syrian (Kharu) was with them as chief (wr). He set plundering their (i.e., the people's) possessions. They made gods like men, and no offerings were presented in the temples.

But when the gods inclined themselves to peace, to set the land in its rights according to its accustomed manner, they established their son, who came forth from their limbs, to be ruler, LPH, of every land, upon their great throne, Userkhaure-setepenre-meryamun, LPH, the son of Re, Setnakht-merire-meryamun, LPH. He was Khepri-Set, when he is enraged; he set in order the entire land which had been rebellious; he slew the rebels who were in the land of Egypt; he cleansed the great throne of Egypt; he was ruler of the Two Lands, on the throne of Atum. He gave ready faces to those who had been turned away. Every man knew his brother who had been walled in. He established the temples in possession of divine offerings, to offer to the gods according to their customary stipulations.

Until 2000, Chancellor Bay was considered the only plausible candidate for this Irsu.  However, an IFAO Ostracon no. 1864 found at Deir el-Medina dated to Year 5 records that 'Pharaoh (Siptah) LPH has killed the great enemy, Bay'. Because Chancellor Bay died at least 3 years before this 'Irsu', he can no longer be considered a plausible candidate for this historical figure.

Genetics
In December 2012, a genetic study conducted by the same researchers who decoded King Tutankhamun's DNA found that Ramesses III, Setnakhte's son and second pharaoh of the Twentieth Dynasty of Egypt belonged to Y-DNA E-M2, alternatively known as haplogroup E1b1a1.

References

Bibliography

 James H. Breasted, Ancient Records of Egypt, Vol No.4,(1906)
 Erik Hornung, Untersuchungen zur Chronologie und Geschichte des Neuen Reiches (1964)
 J. Von Beckerath, Chronologie des Pharaonischen Ägypten, Philip Von Zabern, (Mainz: 1997), pp. 94–98 and pp. 201–202

12th-century BC Pharaohs
Pharaohs of the Twentieth Dynasty of Egypt
1186 BC deaths
Year of birth unknown